Closeness is a basic concept in topology and related areas in mathematics. Intuitively we say two sets are close if they are arbitrarily near to each other. The concept can be defined naturally in a metric space where a notion of distance between elements of the space is defined, but it can be generalized to topological spaces where we have no concrete way to measure distances.

The closure operator closes a given set by mapping it to a closed set which contains the original set and all points close to it. The concept of closeness is related to limit point.

Definition
Given a metric space  a point  is called close or near to a set  if
,
where the distance between a point and a set is defined as 

where inf stands for infimum. Similarly a set  is called close to a set   if

where 
.

Properties
closeness between a point and a set is preserved by continuous functions
closeness between two sets is preserved by uniformly continuous functions

Closeness relation between a point and a set

Let  be some set.

if  is close to  then 

Topological spaces have a closeness relationship built into them: defining a point  to be close to a subset  if and only if  is in the closure of  satisfies the above conditions. Likewise, given a set with a closeness relation, defining a point  to be in the closure of a subset  if and only if  is close to  satisfies the Kuratowski closure axioms. Thus, defining a closeness relation on a set is exactly equivalent to defining a topology on that set.

Closeness relation between two sets
Let , and  be sets.  

Generalized definition
The closeness relation between a set and a point can be generalized to any topological space. Given a topological space and a point ,  is called close to a set  if .

To define a closeness relation between two sets the topological structure is too weak and we have to use a uniform structure. Given a uniform space, sets A and B are called close to each other if they intersect all entourages, that is, for any entourage U, (A×B)∩U is non-empty.

See also
Topological space
Uniform space

References

General topology